Lebanon participated in the 3rd West Asian Games held in Doha, Qatar from December 1, 2005 to December 10, 2005. Lebanon ranked 7th with 4 gold medals and 4 silver medals in this edition of the West Asian Games.

References

West Asian Games
Nations at the 2005 West Asian Games
West Asian Games
Lebanon at the West Asian Games